Jarell Alexander Eddie (born October 30, 1991) is an American professional basketball player for AYOS Konyaspor of the Turkish Basketbol Süper Ligi (BSL). He played college basketball for Virginia Tech before splitting the first four years of his professional career in the NBA and NBA G League. Since 2018, Eddie has played in Europe.

High school career
Eddie attended the Cannon School in Concord, North Carolina, where he was a five-year letter winner for coach Ron Johnson. He scored 2,600 points in his high school career and was an all-conference selection all five years. He was also an all-state selection as a sophomore, junior and senior. As a junior in 2008–09, he averaged 25 points and 8 rebounds per game while leading the Cougars to a co-conference championship in its first year in the Charlotte Independent Schools Athletic Association (CISAA).

In November 2009, Eddie signed a National Letter of Intent to play college basketball for Virginia Tech. He went on to participate in the 2010 Capital Classic, and was ranked nationally #63 by Rivals.com and #77 by Scout.com.

College career
As a freshman at Virginia Tech in 2010–11, Eddie had a subdued role as he averaged just 2.9 points, 2.2 rebounds and 10.9 minutes in 27 games (no starts). He later missed the postseason due to a violation of team rules.

As a sophomore in 2011–12, Eddie appeared in all 33 games with 32 starting assignments. He ranked third on the team in scoring at 9.1 points per game and led the team in scoring on four occasions. He also led the team in three-pointers made (54), three-point percentage (44.3) and free-throw percentage (86.8). In addition, he averaged 4.8 rebounds and 1.4 assists per game.

As a junior in 2012–13, Eddie was named to the ACC All-Academic team. In 32 games (28 starts), he averaged 12.3 points, 5.6 rebounds and 1.3 assists in 30.3 minutes per game.

As a senior in 2013–14, Eddie was named to the ACC All-Academic team for the second straight year. On December 9, 2013, he was named the ACC Player of the Week after he led the Hokies to a pair of wins, including a 61–60 overtime road victory against the defending ACC champion Miami. He scored 24 points against Miami and a career-high 34 points in an 81–63 win over Winthrop. With his first three-pointer in the 72–52 loss to Syracuse on January 7, 2014, Eddie became the 44th player in school history to score 1,000 career points. He finished the 2013–14 season with averages of 13.3 points, 5.4 rebounds and 1.2 assists in 31 games (30 starts).

College statistics

|-
| style="text-align:left;"| 2010–11
| style="text-align:left;"| Virginia Tech
| 27 || 0 || 10.9 || .368 || .219 || .688 || 2.2 || .5 || .1 || .3 || 2.9
|-
| style="text-align:left;"| 2011–12
| style="text-align:left;"| Virginia Tech
| 33 || 32 || 27.3 || .425 || .443 || .868 || 4.8 || 1.4 || .5 || .4 || 9.1
|-
| style="text-align:left;"| 2012–13
| style="text-align:left;"| Virginia Tech
| 32 || 28 || 30.3 || .396 || .321 || .842 || 5.6 || 1.3 || .3 || .8 || 12.3
|-
| style="text-align:left;"| 2013–14
| style="text-align:left;"| Virginia Tech
| 31 || 30 || 32.6 || .355 || .376 || .778 || 5.4 || 1.2 || .4 || .4 || 13.3
|-
| style="text-align:center;" colspan="2"|Career
| 123 || 90 || 25.8 || .385 || .365 || .812 || 4.6 || 1.1 || .3 || .5 || 9.6
|-

Professional career

2014–15 season
After going undrafted in the 2014 NBA draft, Eddie played for the Washington Wizards in the 2014 NBA Summer League. He signed with the Atlanta Hawks on September 29, 2014, but was waived on October 21 after appearing in three preseason games. He was claimed off waivers by the Boston Celtics on October 23, only to be waived again four days later.

On October 30, 2014, Eddie was acquired by the Fort Wayne Mad Ants of the NBA Development League as an affiliate player of the Atlanta Hawks. He was traded to the Austin Spurs two days later. On February 15, 2015, he won the NBA D-League Three-Point Contest during the league's All-Star weekend festivities.

On March 5, 2015, Eddie signed a 10-day contract with the Atlanta Hawks. He parted ways with the Hawks on March 14 before appearing in a game for them after the team decided not to re-sign him to a second 10-day contract. He subsequently returned to the Austin Spurs, where he played out the season. In 50 games for the Spurs in 2014–15, he averaged 13.0 points and 3.6 rebounds per game.

2015–16 season
In July 2015, Eddie joined the Indiana Pacers for the Orlando Summer League and the San Antonio Spurs for the Las Vegas Summer League. He later joined the Golden State Warriors for training camp and preseason.

On October 30, 2015, Eddie was reacquired by the Austin Spurs. On December 23, 2015, he signed with the Washington Wizards. He made his NBA debut three days later, recording 12 points and four rebounds in the Wizards' 111–96 win over the Brooklyn Nets. Signed for his three-point shooting, Eddie went 4-of-5 from three-point range during his debut game. He played out the 2015–16 season with Washington, averaging 2.4 points in 26 games.

2016–17 season
After playing for the Washington Wizards during the NBA Summer League and preseason, he was waived on October 21, 2016.

On October 29, 2016, Eddie was reacquired by the Austin Spurs. On January 25, 2017, he was traded to the Windy City Bulls in exchange for Hollis Thompson.

On March 19, 2017, Eddie signed a 10-day contract with the Phoenix Suns. He made his debut for the Suns later that day, playing 29 minutes and scoring 13 points with two 3-pointers in a 112–95 loss to the Detroit Pistons. He signed a second 10-day contract with the Suns on March 29. He parted ways with the Suns following the expiration of his second 10-day contract.

2017–18 season
After spending preseason with the Chicago Bulls, Eddie re-joined the Windy City Bulls for the 2017–18 NBA G League season.

On January 20, 2018, Eddie signed a 10-day contract with the Boston Celtics. He returned to Windy City on January 30 after not receiving a second 10-day contract from the Celtics. On March 1, 2018, he signed a 10-day contract with the Chicago Bulls. After the 10-day contract expired, he finished the season with Windy City.

2018–19 season
After playing for the Boston Celtics in the 2018 NBA Summer League, Eddie signed with SIG Strasbourg of the LNB Pro A on November 4, 2018. He averaged 11.2 points and 4.5 rebounds per game during the 2018–19 season.

2019–20 season
On July 3, 2019, Eddie signed with UCAM Murcia of the Liga ACB. He averaged 14.3 points per game shooting 44% from three-point range.

2020–21 season
On July 27, 2020, Eddie signed with Fenerbahçe Beko of the Turkish Basketball Super League and EuroLeague. He parted ways with Fenerbahçe on June 30, 2021, after averaging 5.9 points in EuroLeague and 13.2 points in BSL.

2021–22 season
On September 7, 2021, Eddie signed with SIG Strasbourg of the LNB Pro A, returning to the team for a second stint. He made six appearances for Strasbourg between December 18 and January 12.

On January 13, 2022, Eddie signed with San Pablo Burgos of the Spanish Liga ACB.

2022–23 season
On August 7, 2022, Eddie signed with Konyaspor of the Turkish Basketball Super League.

NBA career statistics

Regular season

|-
| align="left" | 
| align="left" | Washington
| 26 || 0 || 5.7 || .308 || .319 || 1.000 || .9 || .2 || .2 || .0 || 2.4
|-
| align="left" | 
| align="left" | Phoenix
| 5 || 0 || 12.5 || .316 || .250 || .889 || 1.4 || .0 || .2 || .0 || 4.8
|-
| align="left" | 
| align="left" | Boston
| 2 || 0 || 2.8 || .000 || .000 || – || .5 || – || .5 || – || 0.0
|-
| align="left" | 
| align="left" | Chicago
| 1 || 0 || 3.0 || .000 || .000 || – || – || – || – || – || 0.0
|-
| align="center" colspan="2" | Career
| 34 || 0 || 6.4 || .302 || .292 || .941 || .9 || .2 || .2 || .0 || 2.6

Personal life
Eddie is the son of Angela and Jessie Eddie, and has two brothers and a sister.

References

External links
ACB profile
NBA G League profile
Virginia Tech Hokies bio 

1991 births
Living people
American expatriate basketball people in France
American expatriate basketball people in Spain
American expatriate basketball people in Turkey
American men's basketball players
Austin Spurs players
Basketball players from Tampa, Florida
Basketball players from North Carolina
Boston Celtics players
CB Miraflores players
CB Murcia players
Chicago Bulls players
Fenerbahçe men's basketball players
Liga ACB players
Phoenix Suns players
SIG Basket players
Small forwards
Undrafted National Basketball Association players
Virginia Tech Hokies men's basketball players
Washington Wizards players
Windy City Bulls players